is a Japanese actor. Ikeuchi's mother is Salvadoran and his father is Japanese. He is an avid martial artist, notably holding a black belt in judo, and is also a keen fisherman.

Career
Ikeuchi played a supporting role as General Miura in Wilson Yip's Ip Man. He also appeared in Kiyoshi Kurosawa's Charisma.

Filmography

Film
 Tokimeki Memorial (1997)
 Dream Studium (1997)
 Blues Harp (1999)
 Charisma (1999)
 Space Travelers (2000)
 Chicken Heart (2002)
 The Boat to Heaven (2003)
 Karaoke Terror (2003)
 Warau Iemon (2004)
 Female (2005)
 Hazard (2005)
 Love My Life (2006)
 Dolphine Blue (2007)
 Ip Man (2008)
 Team Batista no Eikō (2008)
 The Handsome Suit (2008)
 Otonari (2009)
 Space Battleship Yamato (2010)
 The Wrath of Vajra (2013)
 S The Last Policeman - Recovery of Our Future (2015)
 Railroad Tigers (2016)
 Manhunt (2017)
 Eating Women (2018)
 The Battle: Roar to Victory (2019)
 Limbo (2021)
 Yaksha: Ruthless Operations (2022), Yoshinobu Ozawa
 Sadako DX (2022), Kenshin
 Lightning Over the Beyond (2022)

Television
 GTO (1998)
 Beautiful Life (1999)
 Shinsengumi! (2004) - Kusaka Genzui
 Tatta Hitotsu no Koi (2006)
 Sengoku Jieitai: Sekigahara no Tatakai (2006)
 Bambino (2007)
 Yae no Sakura (2013) - Kajiwara Heima
  HERO 2 (2014)
 Kaitō Yamaneko (2016) - Katsuaki Inui
 24 Japan (2020) - Takumi Nanjō

References

External links
 
 

1976 births
Living people
Japanese male actors
Japanese male judoka
Japanese people of Salvadoran descent
Actors from Ibaraki Prefecture